László Hauler (26 June 1884 – 12 September 1914) was a Hungarian sports shooter. He competed in five events at the 1912 Summer Olympics.

References

1884 births
1914 deaths
Hungarian male sport shooters
Olympic shooters of Hungary
Shooters at the 1912 Summer Olympics
People from Satu Mare County